Lac du Bonnet (North) Water Aerodrome  is located  northeast of Lac du Bonnet, Manitoba, Canada.

See also
Lac du Bonnet Airport
Bird River (Lac du Bonnet) Airport
Bird River Water Aerodrome

References

Registered aerodromes in Manitoba
Seaplane bases in Manitoba

Transport in Eastman Region, Manitoba